Christoffel Hendrik Heyns (10 January 1959 – 28 March 2021) was a Professor of Human Rights Law, Director of the Institute for International and Comparative Law in Africa at the University of Pretoria and a member of the United Nations Human Rights Committee. He served as United Nations Special Rapporteur on extrajudicial, summary or arbitrary executions from 2010 to 2016. Heyns was a visiting professor at American University Washington College of Law's Academy on Human Rights and Humanitarian Law (2006–2012).

Education

Heyns held the degrees MA LLB from the University of Pretoria,  an LLM from Yale Law School and PhD from the University of the Witwatersrand. He was also an adjunct professor at the Washington College of Law of the American University and since 2005 a visiting fellow at Kellogg College at Oxford University.

Former positions

 Director - Centre for Human Rights,  University of Pretoria Faculty of Law
 Dean - University of Pretoria Faculty of Law
 Founding editor-in-chief - African Human Rights Law Reports
 Consultant to the United Nations Office of the High Commissioner for Human Rights (inter alia on the establishment of a regional human rights system in South East Asia), the African Union and the South African Human Rights Commission.

Awards

 Fulbright Fellowship to Yale Law School
 Alexander von Humboldt Fellowship to the Max Planck Institute for International and Comparative Public Law in Heidelberg, Germany
 University of Pretoria's Chancellor's Award for Teaching and Learning.

Lectures
 Human Rights Law in Africa in the Lecture Series of the United Nations Audiovisual Library of International Law

References

1959 births
2021 deaths
University of Pretoria alumni
University of the Witwatersrand alumni
Yale Law School alumni
Academic staff of the University of Pretoria
People from Pretoria
United Nations special rapporteurs
South African officials of the United Nations
White South African people